František Doubravský (7 February 1790, Lomnice nad Popelkou – 28 April 1867, Lomnice nad Popelkou) was a Czech composer, choirmaster and organist.

Františrk Doubravský was a prolific composer of classicist era. The list of works content ten basic groups, from which the most number represent composition of sacred music, above all masses.

 Masses (73)
 Salve Regina, Alma, Ave Regina, Regina coeli, Rorate, Stabat Mater apod. (50)
 Graduale, Arias (44)
 Litanie, Vesperae, Invitatoria aj. (33)
 Veni sancte Spiritus
 Te Deum laudamus apod. (23)
 Stationes etc. (17)
 Requiem (13)
 Offertoria (10).
 Secular works (20): symphonies, concerto for violin and orchestra, nocturnes, duets, quartets, serenades and dances (polkas)

1790 births
1867 deaths
Czech Classical-period composers
Czech choral conductors
Czech male classical composers
Czech classical musicians
Czech classical organists
Male classical organists
Czech Romantic composers
19th-century organists
19th-century classical composers
People from Lomnice nad Popelkou
19th-century Czech male musicians